FSH may refer to:

Medicine 
 Follicle-stimulating hormone, a hormone that affects the reproductive system
Facioscapulohumeral muscular dystrophy, a disease that causes progressive impairment of muscles

Companies 
 Fisher Scientific, a defunct American scientific equipment supplier
 Flash Airlines, an Egyptian airline
 Four Seasons Hotels and Resorts, a Canadian hospitality management company
 Fox Sports Houston, a regional Fox Sports Net television station

Other 

Fukuoka SoftBank Hawks, Japanese professional baseball team
FastTrack Scripting Host, a software product for Windows operating systems
fish (Unix shell), an "exotic" Unix operating system shell